Mala Byihan is a village in Zakarpattia Oblast (province) of western Ukraine.

Geography
The village is located northwest of Berehove between Velika Bihany and Balazsér. Administratively, the village belongs to the Berehove Raion, Zakarpattia Oblast.

History
It was first mentioned as Bygan in 1332.

Population
According to the official census of 2001, the population included 1,300 inhabitants of whom more than 90% were Hungarians.

Villages in Berehove Raion